Dominika Cibulková defeated Angelique Kerber in the final, 6–3, 6–4 to win the singles tennis title at the 2016 WTA Finals. It was Cibulková's eighth and final WTA Tour singles title, before her retirement in 2019. For the second year in a row, the eventual champion lost two matches in the round-robin stage.

Agnieszka Radwańska was the defending champion, but lost in the semifinals to Kerber. 

Cibulková, Madison Keys, and Karolína Plíšková made their debuts in the event.

Seeds

Notes:
  Serena Williams had qualified but withdrew due to shoulder injury

Alternates

Draw

Finals

Red group

Standings are determined by: 1. number of wins; 2. number of matches; 3. in two-player ties, head-to-head records; 4. in three-player ties, (a) percentage of sets won (head-to-head records if two players remain tied), then (b) percentage of games won (head-to-head records if two players remain tied), then (c) WTA rankings.

White group
{{4TeamRR-TennisWide
| title-1=
|title-2=RR
|title-3=SetW–L
|title-4=GameW–L
|title-5=Standings

| seed-1=2
| team-1-abbrev= 
| team-1=
| match-w/l-1=2–1
| set-w/l-1=5–2 (71%)
| game-w/l-1=
| standings-1=2

| seed-2=4
| team-2-abbrev= 
| team-2= 
| match-w/l-2=1–2
| set-w/l-2=3–5 (38%)
| game-w/l-2=41–43 (49%)
| standings-2=3

| seed-3=5
| team-3-abbrev= 
| team-3= 
| match-w/l-3=1–2
| set-w/l-3=3–5 (38%)
| game-w/l-3=38–39 (49%)
| standings-3=4

| seed-4=8
| team-4-abbrev= 
| team-4= 
Standings are determined by: 1. number of wins; 2. number of matches; 3. in two-player ties, head-to-head records; 4. in three-player ties, (a) percentage of sets won (head-to-head records if two players remain tied), then (b) percentage of games won (head-to-head records if two players remain tied), then (c) WTA rankings.

References
Main Draw

2016 Singles